Year 1382 (MCCCLXXXII) was a common year starting on Wednesday (link will display the full calendar) of the Julian calendar.

Events 
 January–December 
 January 20 – Princess Anne of Bohemia, a daughter of the late Charles IV, Holy Roman Emperor, becomes the Queen Consort of England by marrying King Richard II; the marriage produces no heirs before her death in 1395.
 May 12 – Charles of Durazzo executes the imprisoned Joanna I of Naples, and succeeds her as Charles III of Naples.
 May 21 – John Wycliffe's teachings are condemned by the Synod of London, which becomes known as the "Earthquake Synod", after its meetings are disrupted by an earthquake.
 August – The iconic painting the Black Madonna of Częstochowa is brought from Jerusalem, to the Jasna Góra Monastery in Poland.
 September – Following the death of Louis I of Hungary and Poland:
 Louis' daughter Mary is crowned the "King" of Hungary. 
 The Poles, who do not wish to be ruled by Mary's fiancee, the future Holy Roman Emperor Sigismund, choose Mary's younger sister, Jadwiga, to become ruler of Poland. After two years of negotiations, Jadwiga is eventually crowned "King" in 1384.
 September 30 – The inhabitants of Trieste (now in northern Italy) donate their city to Duke Leopold III of Austria.
 October – James I succeeds his nephew, Peter II, as King of Cyprus.
 November 27 – Battle of Roosebeke: A French army under Louis II, Count of Flanders defeats the Flemings, led by Philip van Artevelde.

 Date unknown 
 Khan Tokhtamysh of the Golden Horde overruns Muscovy, as punishment for Grand Prince Dmitry Donskoy's resistance to Khan Mamai of the Blue Horde in the 1370s. Dmitry Donskoy pledges his loyalty to Tokhtamysh, and is allowed to remain as ruler of Moscow and Vladimir.
 The Ottomans take Sofia from the Bulgarians.
 After a five-year revolt, Barquq deposes Hajji II as Mamluk Sultan of Egypt, marking the end of the Bahri Dynasty, and the start of the Burji Dynasty.
 Ibrahim I is selected to succeed Husheng, as Shah of Shirvan (now Azerbaijan).
 Kęstutis, the Grand Duke of Lithuania, is taken prisoner by former Grand Duke Jogaila, whilst meeting him to hold negotiations. Kęstutis is subsequently murdered, and Jogaila regains the rule of Lithuania.
 Ahmed deposes his brother, Hussain, as ruler of the Jalayirid Dynasty in western Persia.
 Rana Lakha succeeds Rana Kshetra Singh, as ruler of Mewar (now part of western India).
 Conrad Zöllner von Rothenstein succeeds Winrich von Kniprode, as Grand Master of the Teutonic Knights.
 Balša II of Zeta conquers Albania.
 Dawit I succeeds his brother Newaya Maryam, as Emperor of Ethiopia.
 Winchester College is founded in England.
 Abraham bar Garib becomes Syriac Orthodox Patriarch of Mardin.

Births 
 January 23 – Richard de Beauchamp, 13th Earl of Warwick (d. 1439)
 date unknown
 Frederick IV, Duke of Austria (d. 1439)
 Joan, princess regent of Navarre  (d. 1413)
 Lope de Barrientos, powerful bishop in Castile
 Dawit I of Ethiopia (d. 1413)
 probable – Eric of Pomerania, King of Norway, Sweden and Denmark (d. 1459)

Deaths 
 January 5 – Philippa Plantagenet, Countess of Ulster (b. 1355)
 February 8 – Blanche of France, Duchess of Orléans (b. 1328)
 February 15 – William de Ufford, 2nd Earl of Suffolk (b. c. 1339)
 April 5 – Janusz Suchywilk, Polish nobleman
 May 12 – Queen Joanna I of Naples (b. 1327) (murdered)
 July 11 – Nicole Oresme, French philosopher (b. 1325)
 August 3 or August 15 – Kęstutis, Grand Duke of Lithuania (b. 1297)
 August 13 – Eleanor of Aragon, queen of John I of Castile (b. 1358)
 September 10 – King Louis I of Hungary (b. 1326)
 September 29 – 'Izz al-Din ibn Rukn al-Din Mahmud, malik of Sistan
 October 13 – King Peter II of Cyprus
 October 18 – James Butler, 2nd Earl of Ormond (b. 1331)
 November 27 – Philip van Artevelde, Flemish patriot (b. 1340) (killed in battle)
 Louis Fadrique, Count of Salona

References